Christopher Dion Barnwell (born 6 January 1987) is a West Indian cricketer who plays first-class and List A cricket for Guyana. A Guyana born all-rounder, Barnwell is better known for his clever bowling, but is also a useful pinch hitter in the limited overs format.

Barnwell made his T20I debut for West Indies on 21 April 2011 in the home series against Pakistan. He also played in the one-off T20 match against India on 4 June 2011, in which he scored an unbeaten 34 off just 16 deliveries and also took his maiden T20I wicket. He was also picked for the 2-match T20I series in England in September later that year.

Barnwell was picked up by Royal Challengers Bangalore in the player auction for IPL 2013.

In the 2017 CPL Draft, he was selected as a 10th round pick by the Barbados Tridents. In October 2019, he was named in Guyana's squad for the 2019–20 Regional Super50 tournament. He was the leading run-scorer for Guyana in the tournament, with 351 runs in eight matches.

References

External links

Christopher Barnwell - Yahoo! Cricket Profile

 

Living people
1987 births
Royal Challengers Bangalore cricketers
Guyana cricketers
Guyanese cricketers
West Indies Twenty20 International cricketers
Guyana Amazon Warriors cricketers